Charissa mucidaria, the coppery taupe, is a moth of the family Geometridae. It was described by Jacob Hübner in 1799. It is found in southern Europe and North Africa (including Morocco).

The wingspan is 20–30 mm. Adults are on wing from March to May and again from July to September.

The larvae feed on Sedum, Anagallis, Polygonum and Rumex species.

References

External links

Lepiforum e.V.

Moths described in 1799
Gnophini
Moths of Africa
Moths of Europe
Taxa named by Jacob Hübner